Must Be the Music. Tylko Muzyka was a Polish television musical talent competition contested by aspiring singers and musicians drawn from public auditions. The show was a music competition and reality show that was broadcast in Poland. The winning act received 100,000 zł to help kick-start their music career. In the initial televised audition phase as well as the three semi-finals and final, contestants sang in front of the judges. The show was broadcast on Polsat. Must Be the Music had a live audience behind the judges. During the live finals, the public voted for their favourite act, which they wished to keep in the competition. In June 2016, the network decided to cancel the show after its eleventh season.

Overview

Ratings

Guest performances

References

2010 British television series debuts
Music competitions in Poland
Polish music television series
2011 Polish television series debuts
2016 Polish television series endings
Polish reality television series
Polsat original programming